Eden and John's East River String Band are an American, New York City-based duo, who play country blues from the 1920s and 1930s. The members are John Heneghan (guitar, mandolin and vocals) and Eden Brower (ukulele and vocals). 

The duo often have other musicians sit in with them, including Dom Flemons (formerly of Carolina Chocolate Drops), Pat Conte (of the Canebreak Rattlers and Otis Brothers) and Robert Crumb (of the Cheap Suit Serenaders). 
    
The East River String Band has released seven albums. Their debut, Sweet East River (2006), featured special guests Sophie Crumb (who also provided the cover artwork) on banjolin, Alec Morton from Raging Slab on bass, Jim Stout on banjo and Sam Hopkins on bottleneck guitar. The band's second album, Some Cold Rainy Day (2008), was chosen by David Fricke as one of his "picks" of the month in the November 2008 issue of Rolling Stone. It featured cover artwork by Crumb (as did their three subsequent albums) and special guest pianist Terry Waldo, known for his work with Leon Redbone and Woody Allen. Their third album, Drunken Barrel House Blues (2009), featured special guests Flemons on guitar and quills, Conte on fiddle, and Eli Smith on banjo. Their fourth album, Be Kind to a Man When He's Down (2011), boasted guest players Crumb on mandolin, Flemons on guitar, and Conte on fiddle, banjo, harmonica and vocals. Their fifth album, Take a Look at That Baby (2013), included guests Ernesto Gomez, Joe Bellulovich, Jackson Lynch and Blind Uncle Otis in addition to Crumb, Flemons and Conte.
Their sixth album is named Coney Island Baby (2019) and can be found on eBAY or ordered direct from the band. Their seventh and latest album "Goodbye Cruel World" (2022) can be purchased on eBAY.  Crumb plays, sings and again did the cover art.

Discography

See also
 Country blues
 Delta blues
 Robert Crumb
 Carolina Chocolate Drops

References

External links
 East River String Band Website
 Forced Exposure, the band's label

American blues musical groups
American musical duos